Lichtental is a part of the district of Alsergrund, Vienna. It was an independent municipality until 1850.

Notable people 
 Hans-Adam I, Prince of Liechtenstein (1657–1712) lived here.
 Caterina Cavalieri (1755–1801), opera singer, was born here.
 Therese Grob (1798–1875), the first love of the composer Franz Schubert, was born here.
 Anton von Schmerling (1805–1893), Austrian politician, was born here.
 Georg Herwegh (1817–1875), German writer, died here.
 Johannes Brahms (1833–1897) lived here.

Alsergrund
Katastralgemeinde of Vienna